David Jacobus de Villiers (10 July 1940 – 23 April 2022) was an ordained Minister in the Dutch Reformed Church; a South African Government minister and a Springbok rugby captain.

Biography
His father Coenie was a railway clerk and organizer of the National Party and Member of Parliament for the Vasco constituency from 1953 to 1961. The family moved to Caledon where he began his schooling. However, they moved again a year later to Bellville, where he matriculated in 1959 at the Hoërskool Bellville.

In 1960 he studied at the University of Stellenbosch where he obtained a degree in Theology and gained honours in Philosophy. During 1962 to 1963, he was President of the Student Council.

In 1963–1964, he was a part-time lecturer in philosophy at the University of the Western Cape and was awarded the Abe Bailey and Markotter scholarships. He was the Pastor of the Wellington congregation of the Dutch Reformed Church from 1967 to 1969. After that, he became a lecturer at the Rand Afrikaans University (RAU). In 1972 he completed his MA in philosophy and received a scholarship to study abroad.

He was married to Suzaan Mangold. They had three daughters and a son.

Springbok rugby

De Villiers also excelled in rugby (scrumhalf position) and became involved in all levels of the sport, including representing South Africa in 25 test matches, His first international test match was in 1962 against the British Lions, aged 22. In 1970 he captained the Springboks against New Zealand.

Test history

Politics

While he was lecturing at RAU, the then rector, Gerrit Viljoen, persuaded him at this time to become active in politics. Against his father's wishes, De Villiers entered politics and stood for election. He was elected to the House of Assembly as MP for Johannesburg West and was re-elected in the elections of 1974 and 1977.

In April 1979, De Villiers was appointed South African Ambassador in London. On his return in October 1980 he became Minister of Trade and Industry. The following year he contested the Gardens constituency in Cape Town, but lost to Ken Andrews of the Progressive Federal Party. He was subsequently elected MP for Piketberg, Cape Province.

While he was the Minister of Trade and Industry, the Liquor Act was passed which desegregated South African bars at the owners’ discretion and the South African Tourist Board was established. In 1983, he called a commission to investigate monopolies, and he stimulated small business in rural and ‘homeland’ areas. In 1989 he became Minister of Mineral and Energy Affairs, and of Public Enterprises as well as Cape NP leader.

Death

He died from cancer in Stellenbosch, Western Cape on 23 April 2022.

See also

List of South Africa national rugby union players – Springbok no. 382

References

Attribution
This article contains text from the Afrikaans Wikipedia article - :af:Dawie de Villiers

1940 births
2022 deaths
Deaths from cancer in South Africa
Afrikaner people
Government ministers of South Africa
National Party (South Africa) politicians
Stellenbosch University alumni
South Africa international rugby union players
Ambassadors of South Africa to the United Kingdom
Education ministers of South Africa
Western Province (rugby union) players
Boland Cavaliers players
Golden Lions players
South Africa national rugby union team captains
Rugby union scrum-halves
Rugby union players from the Eastern Cape